Aram Suren Hamparian (born April 18, 1966) is an Armenian American public activist who is the Executive Director of Armenian National Committee of America.

As ANCA Executive Director, Hamparian serves as the organization's national point-person with the Administration, United States Congress, the media, and the Washington, DC foreign policy community. In cooperation with Eastern and Western U.S. regional offices, more than 60 local chapters, dozens of coalition partners, hundreds of community affiliates, and thousands of grassroots activists, he works on a broad range of legislative, policy, research, political, campaign, media, coalition, and community-related concerns. Hamparian has testified before Congress, lectured at the National Defense University, the Foreign Service Institute, and USAID, been quoted by The New York Times, The Wall Street Journal, The Washington Post, Associated Press, Reuters, and has appeared on CNN.

See also
Armenian National Committee of America
Screamers (2006 film)

References

External links
EMM News Explorer:Aram Hamparian
Aram Hamparian in NYT Movies
www.anca.org
www.facebook.com/ancagrassroots
www.twitter.com/anca_DC

American activists
American people of Armenian descent
Living people
1966 births